Events in the year 1875 in Iceland.

Incumbents 

 Monarch: Christian IX
 Minister for Iceland: Christian Sophus Klein (until 11 June); Johannes Nellemann onwards

Events 

 March 28/29 − Askja erupts
 Thorvaldsensfélagið is founded

Births 

 1 March − Sigurður Eggerz, minister for Iceland

References 

 
1870s in Iceland
Years of the 19th century in Iceland
Iceland
Iceland